John A. MacDonald is a Canadian politician, who was elected to the Nova Scotia House of Assembly in the 2021 Nova Scotia general election. He represents the riding of Hants East as a member of the Progressive Conservative Association of Nova Scotia.

He is a small business owner and active volunteer.

References

Living people
Progressive Conservative Association of Nova Scotia MLAs
21st-century Canadian politicians
People from Hants County, Nova Scotia
1979 births